Lucifer Rising is an expanded EP by Swedish doom metal band Candlemass, released in 2008 via  Nuclear Blast. Candlemass recorded two new tracks, "Lucifer Rising" and "White God", and re-recorded "Demons Gate" for this release. The collection is also primarily composed of a series of 9 live tracks recorded in Athens, Greece on their 2007 tour (sides 2 to 4 on the vinyl edition). Recording on the new material was completed in April 2008. The title track, "Lucifer Rising", is included as a bonus song on the digipak edition of the full-length album Death Magic Doom, which was released six months after the EP.

Track listing

Personnel 
Candlemass
 Robert Lowe – vocals
 Mats Björkman – rhythm guitar
 Lars Johansson – lead guitars
 Leif Edling – bass
 Jan Lindh – drums

Production
 Chris Laney – engineering, mixing
 Sören von Malmborg – mastering
 Tomas Arfert – artwork

Charts

References

External links 
 Nuclear Blast announcement
 Encyclopaedia Metallum entry

Candlemass (band) albums
2008 EPs
Live EPs
2008 live albums
Nuclear Blast live albums
Nuclear Blast EPs